The Transformers: More than Meets the Eye was a serialized comic series that was part of IDW Publishing's The Transformers comic book line. Its title was taken from one of the two taglines of the Transformers franchise, while the other was given to its companion series The Transformers: Robots in Disguise. The series opens after the one-shot Death of Optimus Prime, where the Transformers’ planet of Cybertron faces a period of uneasy peace and political instability. In response, Rodimus Prime recruits a large crew of Autobots to search for the Knights of Cybertron, a group of religious ambassadors who had vanished prior to the events of the comic. The series was written by James Roberts and was primarily drawn by Alex Milne. Issues 1 to 22 were primarily coloured by Josh Burcham while issues 28 to 57 were primarily coloured by Joanna Lafuente.

The series ended at issue #57, to be relaunched as Transformers: Lost Light.

Background

Plot

Volume 1: Liars, A to D

Volume 2: Delphi and the Scavengers

Volume 3: Shadowplay

Volume 4

Volume 5: Remain in Light

Dark Cybertron
Issues 23-27 of More than Meets the Eye comprise the even-numbered parts of the Dark Cybertron crossover event; the odd-numbered chapters were originally released in IDW Publishing's other ongoing series, Robots in Disguise.

Volume 6: "Season 2"

Volume 7: Elegant Chaos

Volume 8

Volume 9

Volume 10: The Dying of the Light 

Notes:

Reception

Critical response
The series has been noted for its portrayal of Cybertronians in same-sex relationships.
It has been met with critical acclaim for its politics and overarching plot, though stories from issue 39 onward were criticised for jumping the shark by some readers and fans.

It is noted to be one of the most popular IDW titles.

Transformers: More than Meets the Eye won two Comics Alliance awards, namely "Best of 2015: Continued Excellence in Serial Comics" and "Best of 2016: The Best Sci-Fi Comic of 2016".

Commercial performance

Notes

References

External links
IDW Catalogue

More Than Meets The Eye
LGBT-related comics